Kahriz-e Jamal (also Romanized as Kahrīz-e Jamāl and Kahrīz Jamāl; also known as Kahrīz-e Jamāl od Dīn) is a village in Khezel-e Sharqi Rural District, Khezel District, Nahavand County, Hamadan Province, Iran. At the 2006 census, its population was 382, in 91 families.

References 

Populated places in Nahavand County